Time Will Tell, is a 1992 British-Zimbabwean-American documentary biographical drama film directed by Declan Lowney and produced by Rocky Oldham for Island Pictures. The film based on the life story of Nesta Robert Marley, a Rastafarian prophet who with Peter Tosh and Bunny Wailer popularized reggae music outside Jamaica, along with many taped interviews and narration from legendary Bob Marley.

The film made its premier on 28 May 1992 in the United States. The film received mixed reviews from critics. The film consists with some of most popular songs of Marley such as: "One Love," "Stir It Up," "No Woman, No Cry" and "I Shot the Sheriff".

References

External links 
 IMDb

Zimbabwean documentary films
1992 films
Biographical documentary films
1990s English-language films
British documentary films
Documentary films about music and musicians
1990s British films